Otto Karl Berg (15 August 1815 in Stettin – 20 November 1866 in Berlin) was a German botanist and pharmacist. The official abbreviation of his name, in botany, is O. Berg.

He was the son of Johann Friedrich and Wilhelmine Friederike Berg. He studied pharmaceutical botany at the University of Berlin and published his first Handbuch der Pharmazeutischen Botanik ("Handbook on Pharmaceutical Botany") as he graduated in 1845. In 1848, he married Caroline Albertine Florentine Witthaus, with whom he had six children.

He joined the faculty of Botany and Pharmacology at the University of Berlin in 1849, where he specialized in South American flora. In 1862 he was appointed associate professor, and during his time in that position, he helped to make an independent discipline of pharmacology.

Works
 Handbuch der Pharmazeutischen Botanik. 1845
 Charakteristik der für die Arzneikunde und Technik wichtigsten Pflanzengenera in Illustrationen nebst erläuterndem Text. 1848 (Digital edition from 1845 by the University and State Library Düsseldorf)
 Handbuch der pharmaceutischen Botanik. Band 1: Botanik . Nitze, Berlin 2. Aufl. 1850 Digital edition by the University and State Library Düsseldorf
 with Carl Friedrich Schmidt (1811–1890), Darstellung und Beschreibung sämtlicher in den Pharmacopoea Borussica aufgeführten offizinellen Gewächse. 1853
 Revision Myrtacearum Americae hucusque cognitarum. 1855
 Flora Brasiliensis Myrtographia.... 1855
 Pharmazeutische Warenkunde. 1863 Digital edition by the University and State Library Düsseldorf
 Anatomischer Atlas zur pharmazeutischen Warenkunde. 1865
 Die Chinarinden der pharmakognostischen Sammlung. 1865
 Atlas der officinellen Pflanzen . Vol.1–4 . Felix, Leipzig 2nd ed. 1893–1902 Digital edition by the University and State Library Düsseldorf

References

 

German taxonomists
1815 births
1866 deaths
German pharmacists
Humboldt University of Berlin alumni
Academic staff of the Humboldt University of Berlin
19th-century German botanists